Parliamentary elections were held in Greece in June 1847. Supporters of Ioannis Kolettis won a majority of the 127 seats. However, he remained Prime Minister only until his death on 17 September, after which Kitsos Tzavelas assumed office.

References

Greece
Parliamentary elections in Greece
Legislative
Greece
1840s in Greek politics